The Diocese of Caorle or Diocese of Calina was a Roman Catholic ecclesiastical territory in the town of Carinola in the Province of Caserta in the Italian region Campania. It was suppressed in 1818 to the Diocese of Sessa Aurunca.

History
1099: Erected as the Diocese of Carinola
1818 June 27: Suppressed to the Diocese of Sessa Aurunca
1968: Restored as the Titular Episcopal See of Carinola

Ordinaries
Pedro Gamboa (1501 Succeeded - 18 Nov 1510 Died)
Giovanni Antonio Orfei (18 Nov 1510 Appointed - 1518 Died)
Giovanni Francesco D'Anna (10 Nov 1518 Appointed - 1521 Resigned)
Ferdinando D'Anna (16 Oct 1521 Appointed - 21 Oct 1530 Appointed, Archbishop of Amalfi)
Juan Canuti (21 Oct 1530 Appointed - 15 Jan 1535 Appointed, Bishop of Cariati e Cerenzia)
Taddeo Pepoli, O.S.B. (15 Jan 1535 Appointed - 1549 Died)
Bartolomeo Capranica (9 Apr 1549 Appointed - 1572 Died)
Sisto Diuzioli (2 Jun 1572 Appointed - 1577 Died)
Meliaduce Suico (14 Aug 1577 Appointed - 1581 Died)
Nicola Antonio Vitelli (11 Sep 1581 Appointed - 1594 Died)
Giovanni Vitelli, C.R. (1594 Succeeded - 14 Dec 1609 Appointed, Bishop of Capaccio)
Archangelus de Rossi, C.R.L. (11 Jan 1610 Appointed - 1619 Died)
Alessandro Bosco (20 Nov 1619 Appointed - 8 Aug 1622 Appointed, Bishop of Gerace)
Antonio Bonfiglioli (19 Sep 1622 Appointed - 1624 Resigned)
Onufrius Sersagli (7 Oct 1624 Appointed - 1640 Died)
Vencent Cavaselice (13 Aug 1640 Appointed - 1664 Died)
Paolo Airolo, C.R.M. (9 Jun 1664 Appointed - Sep 1702 Died)
Alphonsus del Balzo  (15 Jan 1703 Appointed - Sep 1705 Died)
Antonio della Marra, C.R. (25 Jan 1706 Appointed - 13 May 1714 Died)
Domenico Antonio Cirillo  (10 Jan 1718 Appointed - 14 Feb 1724 Appointed, Bishop of Teano)
Nicola Michele Abati (Abbate)  (26 Jun 1724 Appointed - 28 Sep 1733 Appointed, Bishop of Squillace)
Hyacinthus Verdesca (1 Oct 1733 Appointed - Sep 1747 Died)
Giovanni Bufalini (18 Dec 1747 Appointed - 28 Nov 1748 Died)
Antonio Francesco de Plato (3 Mar 1749 Appointed - 3 Mar 1760 Appointed, Bishop of Tricarico)
Francesco Antonio Salomone (3 Mar 1760 Appointed - 16 May 1766 Died)
Thomas Zarone  (21 Jul 1766 Appointed - Aug 1791 Died)
Giovanni Gaetano del Muscio, Sch. P. (26 Mar 1792 Confirmed - 18 Dec 1797 Confirmed, Bishop of San Severo)
Salvatore de Lucia  (18 Dec 1797 Confirmed - )

See also
Catholic Church in Italy

References

Former Roman Catholic dioceses in Italy